The 1930 New Year Honours were appointments by King George V to various orders and honours to reward and highlight good works by citizens of the United Kingdom and British Empire. They were announced on 31 December 1929.

The recipients of honours are displayed here as they were styled before their new honour, and arranged by honour, with classes (Knight, Knight Grand Cross, etc.) and then divisions (Military, Civil, etc.) as appropriate.

United Kingdom and Colonies

Baron
Major Dudley Leigh Aman  For public and political services.
The Right Honourable Sir Willoughby Hyett Dickinson  Honorary Secretary of the World Alliance for promoting International Friendship through the Churches. For public services and for services in the cause of peace.
Sir William Joseph Noble  Ex-President of the Chamber of Shipping of the United Kingdom.
Arthur Augustus William Harry Ponsonby  Parliamentary Secretary, Ministry of Transport. For public and political services.
Marshal of the Royal Air Force Sir Hugh Montague Trenchard  Chief of the Air Staff since 1919.
Colonel, Royal Scots Fusiliers Sir Charles Cheers Wakefield  For public and philanthropic services.

Privy Councillor
The King appointed the following to His Majesty's Most Honourable Privy Council:
Colonel George Joachim, Viscount Goschen  Lately Governor of Madras.

Baronetcies
Louis Bernhard Baron. For public and philanthropic services.
Sir (Thomas) Gregory Foster  Provost of University College, London, and recently Vice-Chancellor of the University.
Sir William Middlebrook  For distinguished public services over a long period of years. Formerly Chairman of the Local Legislation Committee of the House of Commons.
Sir Eustace Henry William Tennyson-d'Eyncourt  At one time Director of Naval Construction, Admiralty.

Knight Bachelor

John Ballinger  Librarian of the National Library of Wales, Aberystwyth.
Professor Granville Bantock  Professor of Music, Birmingham University.
Alderman Herbert Carden. For public services in Sussex.
Lawrence Wensley Chubb, Secretary of the Commons and Footpaths Preservation Society for 35 years. Secretary of the National Playing Fields Association since 1928.
Lieutenant-Colonel Henry Walter George Cole  Director, Exhibitions Division, Department of Overseas Trade.
Reginald Kennedy-Cox  Honorary Warden of the Dockland Settlements and Malvern Clubs Council.
Nigel George Davidson.  Legal Secretary to the Sudan Government.
Edward Francis Knapp Fisher. Receiver General of Westminster Abbey.
Archibald Dennis Flower, Chairman of the Governors of the Shakespeare National Memorial Theatre, Stratford-on-Avon.
James Henry Ford, Clerk to the Leeds Board of Guardians. Member of the Executive Council of the Association of Poor Law Unions.
Colonel St. John Corbet Gore  Lieutenant of His Majesty's Body Guard of the Honourable Corps of Gentlemen at Arms.
Charles Henry Gott, Chief Valuer (England and Wales); Board of Inland Revenue.
Edward William Hansell  Official Referee, Supreme Court of Judicature.
Lieutenant-Colonel James Stuart Knox  Prison Commissioner and Director of Convict Prisons.
Professor Thomas Percy Nunn  Principal, London Day Training College and Professor of Education University of London.
Archibald Page, Chief Engineer and Manager, Central. Electricity Board. A Past President of the Institute of Electrical Engineers.
George William Paton, Chairman and Managing Director of Bryant and May Limited. For public services.
Tom Percival, Clerk to the Tynemouth Board of Guardians. Formerly President of the National Poor Law Officers Association.
John Ritchie, Chief Inspector, Board of Customs and Excise.
Alfred William Tyler  Manager, Co-operative Printing Society.
Emery Walker, Process engraver and Printer. Past Master of the Art Workers Guild. Late President of the Arts and Crafts Exhibition Society, A Trustee of the Wallace Collection and a Fellow of the Society of Antiquaries.
Frederick Joseph Wall, Secretary of the Football Association.
Percy Emerson Watkins, Permanent Secretary, Welsh Department, Board of Education.
William Edward Whyte  Clerk to the Middle Ward District Committee of Lanarkshire.
William Courthope Townshend Wilson  Vice-Chancellor of the County Palatine of Lancaster.
Raymond Wybrow Woods  Solicitor to the General Post Office.

Dominions
The Honourable James William Blair, Chief Justice of the Supreme Court, State of Queensland.
The Honourable Thomas Kay Sidey, Attorney General, Dominion of New Zealand.
Lieutenant-Colonel Robert Eccles Snowden  Agent General in London for the State of Tasmania.

British India
Diwan Bahadur Mannath Krishnan Nayar Avargal, Member of the Executive. Council of the Governor of Madras.
Khan Bahadur Chaudhary Shahab-ud-din, President of the Legislative Council, Punjab.
Justice Charles Edwin Odgers, Puisne Judge of the High Court, Madras.
Justice Barjor Jamshedji Dalai, Indian Civil Service, Puisne Judge of the High Court, Allahabad.
Alexander Rodger  Indian Forest Service, Inspector-General of Forests, Government of India.
Lieutenant-Colonel Richard Henry Chenevix-Trench  Political Department of the Government of India, Member of Council, His Exalted Highness the Nizam's Government, Hyderabad. 
Alexander Macdonald Rouse  Indian Service of Engineers, Chief Engineer, Delhi.
Patrick Aloysius Kelly  Indian Police Service, Commissioner of Police, Bombay.
Lieutenant-Colonel Walter Dorling Smiles  Assam.
Maharaja Bahadur Keshav Prashad Singh  Zamindar of Dumraon, Bihar and Orissa.
Mohamed Ismail  Diwan of Mysore State.
Dinshah Fardunji Mulla  Advocate, Bombay High Court.
Khan Bahadur Shah Nawaz Khan Bhutto  President, District Local Board, Larkana, Bombay.
Harisankar Paul, Bengal.

Colonies, Protectorates, etc.
John Maxwell  Chief Commissioner, Ashanti.
Herbert Cecil Stronge, Chief Justice, Leeward Islands.
Henry Barclay Walcott  Treasurer, Colony of Trinidad and Tobago.
Wilfrid Wentworth Woods  Colonial Treasurer, Island of Ceylon.
Professor Themistocles Zammit  Curator of the Museum, Malta. For scientific services.

The Most Honourable Order of the Bath

Knight Grand Cross of the Order of the Bath (GCB)

Military Division
Royal Navy
Admiral Sir William Edmund Goodenough

Knight Commander of the Order of the Bath (KCB)
Military Division
Royal Navy
General Lewis Stratford Tollemache Halliday 

Army
Lieutenant-General Sir Percy Pollexfen de Blaquiere Radcliffe  Half pay list, formerly General Officer Commanding 4th Division. 
Lieutenant-General Kenneth Wigram  Indian Army, Commander, Waziristan District, India.
Lieutenant-General Cyril Norman Macmullen  Indian Army, late Commander, Rawalpindi District, India.

Companion of the Order of the Bath (CB)
Military Division
Royal Navy
Rear-Admiral Harold Owen Reinold  
Rear-Admiral Gilbert Owen Stephenson  (Retired). 
Surgeon Rear-Admiral Robert William Basil Hall 
Colonel Richard Foster Carter Foster 
Paymaster Captain Robert Alfred Jinkin 

Army
Major-General David Harvey  (late Royal Army Medical Corps), Director of Pathology, The War Office.
Major-General William Samuel Anthony  (late Royal Army Veterinary Corps), Director-General, Army Veterinary Services, The War Office.
Colonel (temporary Brigadier) Charles John Cecil Grant  (late Coldstream Guards), Commander, 8th Infantry Brigade.
Colonel Francis William Gosset  (late Royal Artillery), Special Appointment, His Britannic Majesty's Embassy, Berlin.
Colonel (temporary Brigadier) Hugh Roger Headlam  (late The King's Own Royal Regiment (Lancaster)), Commander, 12th (Secunderabad) Infantry Brigade, India.
Colonel (temporary Brigadier) William George Shedden Dobbie  (late Royal Engineers), Commander, Cairo Brigade, Egypt.
Major-General William Louis Oberkirch Twiss  Indian Army, Commander, Jullundur Brigade Area, India.
Colonel (temporary Brigadier) Ivan Urmston Battye  Indian Army, Commander, Ferozepur Brigade Area, India.
Colonel Frederick George Edward Lumb  Indian Army, late Assistant Adjutant & Quarter-Master-General, Rawalpindi District, India.
Colonel Gerald Bassett Scott  Indian Army, Inspecting Officer, Frontier Corps, and Secretary to Chief Commissioner, North West Frontier, India.
Colonel Arthur Brownfield Fry  Indian Medical Service, Assistant Director of Medical Services, Presidency and Assam District, India.

Royal Air Force
Air Commodore Reginald Percy Mills  Royal Air Force.

Civil Division
Colonel Joseph Francis Noel Baxendale  Retired, Territorial Army. 
Lieutenant-Colonel Hugh Bowes  late Territorial Army Reserve of Officers.
Herbert Ernest Fass  Principal Assistant Secretary, Treasury.
William Wallace McKechnie  Secretary, Scottish Education Department.
John Charles Walton  Secretary, Political Department, India Office.

The Most Exalted Order of the Star of India

Knight Grand Commander (GCSI)
Field Marshal Sir William Riddell Birdwood  Indian Army, Commander-in-Chief in India.

Knight Commander (KCSI)
His Highness Maharaja Shri Lakhdirji Waghji, Maharaja of Morvi.

Companion (CSI)
Harry Graham Haig  Indian Civil Service, Secretary to the Government of India, Home Department.
Walter Hugh John Wilkinson  Indian Civil Service, lately British Envoy at the Court of Nepal.
Hugh Aylmer Thornton  Indian Civil Service, Commissioner, Burma.
Cyril James Irwin  Indian Civil Service, Commissioner, Central Provinces.

The Most Distinguished Order of Saint Michael and Saint George

Knight Grand Cross of the Order of St Michael and St George (GCMG)
Sir Horace Archer Byatt  lately Governor and Commander-in-Chief of the Colony of Trinidad and Tobago.
The Right Honourable Sir Malcolm Arnold Robertson  lately His Majesty's Ambassador Extraordinary and Plenipotentiary at Buenos Aires.
The Right Honourable Sir Joseph George Ward  Prime Minister of the Dominion of New Zealand.

Knight Commander of the Order of St Michael and St George (KCMG)
Lieutenant-Colonel Andrew Balfour  Member of the Colonial Advisory Medical and Sanitary Committee, Director of the London School of Hygiene and Tropical Medicine.
William Cecil Bottomley  Assistant Under-Secretary of State, Colonial Office.
Sir Edward Thomas Frederick Crowe  Comptroller-General of the Department of Overseas Trade.
Frederick William Leith-Ross  Deputy Controller of Finance, Treasury. For services in connection with reparations.
Horatio George Arthur Mackie  His Majesty's Consul-General at Paris.
Sir James Crawford Maxwell  Governor and Commander-in-Chief of Northern Rhodesia.
The Honourable Michael Myers, Chief Justice of New Zealand.
Professor the Honourable John Beverley Peden  President of the Legislative Council, State of New South Wales.
Frederick William Leith-Ross  Deputy Controller of Finance, Treasury. For services in connection with reparations.
Alexander Telford Waugh  lately His Majesty's Consul-General at Constantinople.

Companion of the Order of St Michael and St George (CMG)
Harold d'Auvergne Aplin, Senior Provincial Commissioner, Nyasaland Protectorate.
Shirley Clifford Atchley  Translator at His Majesty's Legation at Athens.
Major The Honourable Cecil James Campbell, Legal Secretary to the Financial Adviser to the Egyptian Government.
Roland John Farrer, President of the Municipal Commissioners, Singapore. 
Major William Birrell Gray, Administrator of the Colony, Nigeria.
Arthur Francis Grimble, Resident Commissioner, Gilbert and Ellice Islands Colony.
Herbert Hall Hall, one of the Inspectors-General of His Majesty's consular establishments.
Edward William Kane, Clerk of the House of Representatives, Dominion of New Zealand.
Walter David Loveridge, President of the Sydney Harbour Trust, State of New South Wales.
Eric Charles Miéville, Secretary to the Governor-General of the Dominion of Canada.
John Godfrey Matthew  Secretary for Education, Sudan Government.
Francis d'Arcy Godolphin Osborne, Counsellor in His Majesty's Diplomatic Service.
Robert Parker, a leading member of the musical profession in the Dominion of New Zealand.
James Scott Pitkeathly  for services as Director of Electrical Undertakings, Island of Ceylon.
Lieutenant-Colonel Heaton Forbes Robinson, Director of Works, Imperial War Graves Commission.

Order of the Indian Empire

Knight Grand Commander (GCIE)
Major His Highness Raj Rajeshwar Maharajadhiraja Sir Umaid Singh Bahadur  Maharaja of Jodhpur.

Knight Commander (KCIE)
Lancelot Graham  Indian Civil Service, Secretary to the Government of India, Legislative Department.
Sir Edwin Landseer Lutyens 
Lieutenant-Colonel Henry Beauchamp St John  Agent to the Governor-General and Chief Commissioner in Baluchistan.
Alexander Montague Stow  Indian Civil Service, Member of the Executive Council of the Governor of the Punjab.
Thakore Sahib Shri Bahadursinhji Mansinhji, Thakore Sahib of Palitana.

Companion (CIE)
Lieutenant-Colonel Robert John Wingfield Heale  officiating Agent to the Governor-General in Central India.
Mathew Brown Cameron  Vice-Chancellor, Lucknow University.
Alexander Norman Ley Cater, Indian Civil Service, Agent to the Governor-General in the Madras States.
Frederic Alexander Sachse, Indian Civil Service, Commissioner, Bengal.
Maurice Gamier Hallett, Indian Civil Service, Bihar and Orissa.
Abraham James Laine, Indian Civil Service, Assam.
Donald James Boyd, Indian Civil Service, Punjab.
John Clague, Indian Civil Service, Chief Secretary to the Government of Burma.
Colonel George Whitehall Ross  Indian Army, Military Accountant-General.
Diwan Bahadur Jannyavula Venkatanarayana Nayudu Garu, Provincial Civil Service, Secretary to the Government of Madras.
Tennant Sloan, Indian Civil Service, Secretary to Government, United Provinces.
Robert George Grieve, Indian Educational Service, Director of Public Instruction, Madras.
Samuel Walker  Indian Service of Engineers, Chief Engineer and Secretary for Irrigation, North-West Frontier Province.
Maurice Webb, Indian Civil Service, Bombay. 
Harold Lancelot Newman, Indian Forest Service, Chief Conservator of Forests, Bombay.
Lieutenant-Colonel Walter Valentine Coppinger  Indian Medical Service, Inspector-General of Civil Hospitals, Central Provinces.
Bryce Chudleigh Burt  Indian Agricultural Service, Imperial Council of Agricultural Research, India.
Lieutenant-Colonel Arthur Francis Hamilton  Indian Medical Service, Professor of Midwifery, Grant Medical College, Bombay.
John Lewis Sale, Indian Service of Engineers, Superintending Engineer, Delhi.
William Poulter Roberts  Indian Service of Engineers, Superintending Engineer, Cauvery-Mettur Project, Madras.
Lieutenant-Colonel James Carmichael More  Indian Army, lately Political Agent, Kuwait, Persian Gulf.
Sardar Bahadur Teja Singh Malik, Indian Service of Engineers, Executive Engineer, Delhi.
Mian Mohammad Shah Nawaz, Member of the Legislative Assembly, Barrister at Law, Lahore.
Rao Bahadur Kesho Waman Brahma  Pleader, Befar, Central Provinces.
Khan Bahadur Sardar Hassan Khan, Gorchani, Officiating Tumandar of the Gurchani Tuman, Dera Ghazi Khan.

Order of the Crown of India
Margaret Evelyn, Viscountess Goschen.

The Royal Victorian Order

Knight Grand Cross of the Royal Victorian Order (GCVO)
Henry Hugh Arthur Fitzroy, Duke of Beaufort. 
The Right Honourable Sir Frederick George Milner 
Admiral Sir Colin Richard Keppel

Knight Commander of the Royal Victorian Order (KCVO)
Admiral Henry Hervey Campbell 
Colin John Davidson 
Russell Facey Wilkinson  
Leonard Lionel Cohen.

Commander of the Royal Victorian Order (CVO)
Sir George Washington Badgerow 
Brigadier-General George Camborne Beauclerk Paynter 
Herbert Stanley French 
John Henry Girling

Member of the Royal Victorian Order, 4th class (MVO)
The Reverend Albert Lee  (Fifth Class).
Hugh Hutchison Cassells.
The Reverend Prebendary Arthur Chilton 
Squadron Leader David Sigismund Don 
Geoffrey Cecil Hollings (Dated 19 December 1929.)
John Harold Edmund Woods.

Member of the Royal Victorian Order, 5th class (MVO)
Superintendent James McBrien  Metropolitan Police. (Dated 11 December 1929.)

The Most Excellent Order of the British Empire

Knight Grand Cross of the Order of the British Empire (GBE)
Military Division
Royal Navy
Admiral Sir Edward Eden Bradford  (Retired).

Dame Commander of the Order of the British Empire (DBE)
The Honourable Mary, Lady Bailey. For services to aviation.

Knight Commander of the Order of the British Empire (KBE)
Civil Division
Harry Halton Fox  Commercial Counsellor attached to His Majesty's Legation at Peking.
The Honourable Stanley Seymour Argyle  lately Chief Secretary and Minister of Public Health, State of Victoria.

British India
Mian Gul, Wadud of Swat, North-West Frontier Province.

Colonies, Protectorates, etc.
Sir Frank Morrish Baddeley  Chief Secretary to Government, Nigeria.

Honorary Knight Commanders
Raja Chulan  bin Sultan Abdullah, the Raja di Hilir of Perak, Federated Malay States.
His Beatitude Yeghishe Turian, the Armenian Patriarch at Jerusalem.

Commander of the Order of the British Empire (CBE)
Military Division
Royal Navy
Captain (Commodore 2nd Class) Richard Augustus Sandys Hill 

Army
Colonel George Bridges Stevens  lately Officer Commanding Ceylon Planters Rifle Corps.

Civil Division
The Honourable Walter John Harry Boyle, Senior Official Receiver, Bankruptcy (High Court) Department, Board of Trade.
Professor John Samuel Strafford Brame  Professor of Chemistry and Metallurgy, Royal Naval College, Greenwich.
Lieutenant-Colonel Alexander Francis Somerville Caldwell  Principal Education Officer, Air Ministry.
Edmund Ralph Cook, Secretary to the Law Society. For services in connection with the establishment of the High Court Poor Persons Procedure.
Charlotte Leonora, Lady Cooper  For public and charitable services.
Captain Alban Tabor Austin Dobson, Assistant Secretary, Ministry of Agriculture and Fisheries.
Alfred Dryland  County Surveyor of Middlesex. A Past President of the County Surveyors Society.
Bernard Richard Theodore Grindle, Assistant Secretary, War Office.
Morris Heyes , Treasurer and Accountant, Metropolitan Asylums Board.
Percival Edward Meadon, Director of Education, Lancashire.
Herbert George Muskett, Member of the firm of Wontner and Sons, Solicitors to the Commissioner of Metropolitan Police.
Coventry Dick Peddie, lately Secretary, Northern Lighthouse Commissioners.
Anne Glenday Philip, Chief Woman Inspector of Schools (England and Wales). 
Arthur Pugh  For public services.
Rose Rosenberg. Personal Private Secretary to the Prime Minister. 
Alderman Frank Sheppard  Chairman of the Bristol Juvenile Advisory Committee; and lately Vice-Chairman of the Bristol Local Employment Committee.
Sidney Stallard  Divisional Road Engineer, Ministry of Transport.
William James Thome  Member of Parliament for the Plaistow Division of West Ham. General Secretary of the National Union of General and Municipal Workers. For public and political services.
Frank Newton Tribe  Principal, Ministry of Labour. Lately Principal Private Secretary to the Minister.

Diplomatic Service And Overseas List
Clifford Edward Heathcote-Smith  His Majesty's Consul-General at Alexandria.
Charles Armine Willis  Governor of Upper Nile Province, Sudan.

British India
Lieutenant-Colonel William Arthur MacDonell Garstin  Political Agent, Khyber, North-West Frontier Province.
Ramchandra Madhavram Bhatt, Bombay.

Colonies, Protectorates, etc.
Arthur Albert Luckham, Resident Commissioner, Niue Island, Dominion of New Zealand.
Rosa Sibella Macarthur Onslow. For philanthropic services in the State of New South Wales.
James Andrews-Speed, formerly Unofficial Member of the Executive Council, Gibraltar. For public services.
George Eaton Stannard Cubitt, Conservator of Forests, Straits Settlements and Federated Malay States.
Charles William Doorly, Administrator of Saint Lucia.
George Cornibert du Boulay, Deputy Colonial Secretary, Gold Coast.
Harold Edwin Goodship, Chief Accountant, Kenya and Uganda Railways and Harbours.

Honorary Commanders
Choo Kia Peng, formerly Unofficial Member of the Federal Council, Federated Malay States. For public services.
Muhammed Diko, Emir of Katsina, Nigeria.
Sheikh Suleiman bin Nasur el Lemki  senior Arab Member of the Legislative Council, Zanzibar.

Officer of the Order of the British Empire (OBE)
Military Division
Royal Navy
Commander Graham Cunningham Glen  (Retired).
Commander Geoffrey Coleridge Boles  (Retired).
Surgeon Commander William Innes Gerrard  (Retired).

Army
Major Walter Scott Blackett  Quartermaster, Ceylon Mounted Rifles.
Major (temporary Lieutenant-Colonel) Arthur Butler Clough  Royal Engineers, lately employed with the Rhodesian-Congo Boundary Commission.
Captain and Brevet Major Stanley James Cole, The Prince of Wales's Volunteers (South Lancashire), Staff Officer to the Inspector-General, Royal West African Frontier Force.
Major Henry Edward Green  formerly The King's African Rifles, Staff Officer, Nyasaland Volunteer Reserve.

Civil Division
Walter Louis Addyman, Deputy Controller, Pension Issue Office, Ministry of Pensions.
Frank Blackburn, Deputy Chief Insurance Officer, Ministry of Labour.
Alfred Bond, Assistant Controller, Money Order Department, General Post Office.
Herbert Buckland, Assistant Accountant General, General Post Office.
William Bertram Chrimes  Chairman of the Liverpool King's Roll Committee, and member of the King's Roll National Council.
Philip Clark, Head Clerk, Central Office of the Supreme Court, of Judicature.
Alfred William Ayers Cuett  Manager; Constructive Department, H.M. Dockyard, Chatham.
William Lewis Cook  Conciliation Officer and Assistant Labour Adviser, Mines Department.
Maria Elizabeth Dickin. Founder and Honorary Director of the People's Dispensary for Sick Animals of the Poor.
Edward George Dixon  For social and philanthropic services in Woolwich.
Alexander Donald, Chief Constable of Kirkcudbright and Wigtown.
Osmonde Hedworth Farrar, Master, S.S. Haiching, Hong Kong. For valuable services and personal bravery in frustrating attempted piracy.
John George Fitzsimons, Deputy Inspector-General of Waterguard, Board of Customs and Excise.
Tom Shirley Hawkins  Civil Engineer, Secretarial Department, Ministry of Transport.
Captain Giovanni Jenkin, Principal District Officer, Mercantile Marine Survey Service, Board of Trade.
Captain Roger Norman Liptrot  Principal Technical Officer, Air Ministry.
Robert McGregor, Superintending Clerk, Department of the Accountant General of the Navy.
Isabella Mcintosh McNair. For public services in the East of Scotland.
Major Hugh Cochrane MacTier, Governor, Wandsworth Prison.
Herbert William Mitchell, Senior Inspector of Taxes, Board of Inland Revenue.
The Reverend Canon William Morgan  Chairman of the Bangor and Beaumaris Board of Guardians, Alderman and ex-Chairman of Caernarvonshire County Council.
Frederick Percy Nathan  Leader, Salford Special Constabulary.
Lieutenant-Colonel Herbert Pearson Creagh-Osborne, Retired Officer, Directorate of Movements and Quartering, War Office.
Helen Grace Palin  Principal Matron, Ministry of Pensions Nursing Service.
Charles Allen Palmer, Secretary, Office of the Receiver for the Metropolitan Police.
Robert Perry, Chief Officer, S.S. Haiching, Hong Kong. For valuable services and personal bravery in frustrating attempted piracy.
Thomas Arthur Prest, Chief Examiner, Estate Duty Office, Board of Inland Revenue.
Lily Richards, Matron, Royal Westminster Ophthalmic Hospital.
William Alexander Ross, Principal, Ministry of Health.
Edward Stuart Russell  Director of Fishery Investigations, Ministry of Agriculture and Fisheries.
Michael Ryan, Superintending Inspector, Board of Customs and Excise.
Henry Martin Spencer, Deputy Director of Education, Staffordshire.
Lieutenant-Colonel John Steele  Commandant and Secretary; Royal Hospital, Kilmainham.
Arthur Henry Ward, Clerk to the West Bromwich Board of Guardians.
Dorothy Gladys Ward, Joint Secretary, Children's Country Holidays Fund. 
James Gray West  Senior Architect, Office of Works.
William Williams, Superintending Inspector, Factories Department, Home Office.
William Wilson, Chief Clerk, Establishments Department, Ministry of Labour.

Diplomatic Service And Overseas List
Edward Lawrence Cockell, Voluntary worker in His Majesty's Legation at Commercial Counsellor's Office at Peking.
Harold Armstrong Crouch  Medical Inspector, Upper Nile Province, Sudan.
James Dalton  late British Vice-Consul at Samarang.
Charles Joseph Kavanagh, Commercial Secretary, Grade II, attached to His Majesty's Embassy at Berlin, on his retirement.
Bernard Pelly, His Majesty's Consul at Seattle.

Colonies, Protectorates, etc.
Pierre Adam, Nominated Member of the Council of Government, Mauritius.
Christopher Francis Battiscombe, Private Secretary to His Highness the Sultan of Zanzibar.
The Venerable Archdeacon Samuel Edmund Branch  lately Headmaster of the Antigua Grammar School. For services to education.
Alfred Herbert Crook  Headmaster of Queen's College, Hong Kong.
Banner Carruthers Johnstone, Provincial Commissioner, Zanzibar. 
Joseph Jones, formerly Curator of the Botanic Gardens, Dominica.
Sydney Hubert La Fontaine  District Officer, Kenya.
William Alfred Stedwell Lamborn  Medical Entomologist, Nyasaland Protectorate.
Arthur Alexander Legat, Manager of the National Bank of India in Kenya Colony. For public services.
Captain Cyril Charles Lilley, District Commissioner, Gold Coast. For services on the Anglo-French Togoland Boundary Commission.
Frederick Claud Marriott, Director of Education, Colony of Trinidad and Tobago.
Leon Emile Pitot, Chairman of the Board of Commissioners, Curepipe, Mauritius.
Charles Johnston Smith  Senior Surgeon, Singapore.
William Tait-Bowie. For public services in the Nyasaland Protectorate.

British India
Subrahmanya Ranganathan, Indian Civil Service, formerly Agent of the Government of India in Ceylon.
Piyara Mirza, Provincial Civil Service, Bihar and Orissa (retired).
William Robert Mustoe, Superintendent, Horticultural Operations, Delhi.
Ernest Samuel George Chivers, Military Engineer Services, Karachi.
Arthur Gordon Shoosmith, Architect, Delhi.
Harry William Hogg, Provincial Secretary, Boy Scouts Association, Punjab.

Member of the Order of the British Empire (MBE)
Civil Division
John Aikman, Assistant, Royal Botanic Gardens, Kew.
Henry Allen Armitage, Clerk to the Gloucester Board of Guardians; Member of the Council of the Poor Law Unions Association.
Emily Bambridge, First Glass. Clerk, Ministry of Health.
Ralph Patterson Barrass, Relieving Officer, Houghton-le-Spring Board of Guardians
Ernest Arthur Bearder  Technical Adviser, Dyestuffs Advisory Licensing Committee.
Thomas Henry Beckett, Principal Clerk, Works and Casual Wards Department, Metropolitan Asylums Board.
Ernest Hick Bennett, Staff Officer, Treasury.
William George Tabor Blois, General Secretary, The National Federation of Meat Traders Associations.
Albert Harry Boyd, Clerical Officer, Higher Grade, Colonial Office.
Helen Florence-Butler, Assistant Accountant, Ministry of Health. 
John Carr, Esq., Chief Superintendent and Deputy Chief Constable, Newcastle upon Tyne City Police. 
Thomas Guthrie Carr, Chairman of the Newcastle, Hexham and District War Pensions Committee.
Samuel Charles Castleton, Second Class Officer, South Eastern Divisional Office, Ministry of Labour. 
John Albert Concannon, Superintendent, Metropolitan Police.
Mary Inglis Davidson Coutts, Member of the Aberdeen, Banff and Kincardine War Pensions Committee.
Charles Crouch, Staff Officer, Board of Inland Revenue.
Frederick Charles Dixon, Chief Engineer, S.S. Haiching, Hong Kong. For valuable services and personal bravery in frustrating attempted piracy.
Thomas Garrard Ellison, Assistant Engineer, Grade II, Office of Works.
Lucy Emmerson, Secretary Shorthand Typist, Home Office.
Thomas Ennion, Superintendent, Cheshire County Constabulary.
Jane Elizabeth Firth (Sister Clare (S.N.D.)), Head Mistress of Notre Dame Roman Catholic Central School, Liverpool.
Henry Roland Godfrey, Staff Clerk, Secretariat, War Office. Arthur Allan Gomme, Librarian, Patent Office, Board of Trade.
Frank Albert Hollis, Head Master, Cooper Endowed School, Tewin, Hertfordshire.
Elsie Hughes, Secretary to the Rt. Hon. Lord Dawson of Penn  Physician in Ordinary to His Majesty the King. For services, during His Majesty's recent illness.
Alan Frederick Johnson, Second Officer, S.S. Haiching, Hong Kong. For valuable services and personal bravery in frustrating attempted piracy.
James William Johnson, Chairman of the Southampton, Isle-of-Wight, Winchester and District War Pensions Committee.
George Chessor Leith, Senior Valuation Clerk, Board of Inland Revenue.
Harriet Mary Lloyd, Co-opted Member of the Atchain Board of Guardians.
Lieutenant James Malcolm Maguire  (Retired), District Officer, His Majesty's Coastguard.
Henry Sutcliffe Marshall, Senior Executive Officer, Secretary's Office, Board of Customs and Excise.
Dorothy Morgan, Member of Liverpool Board of Guardians.
William George Morris, Contracts Officer, War Office.
Charles Albert Pearce  Permanent Salaried Officer, Ministry of Pensions.
George James Prentice, Superintending Clerk, Accountant-General's Department, Admiralty.
Percy Vaughan Frederick Raffaelli, Senior Staff Officer, Ministry of Pensions.
Tom Robinson, First Class Officer, Blackburn Employment Exchange.
Ernest Edward Rogers  Examiner of Technical Accounts, Electrical Engineering Department, Admiralty.
Arthur Goulborn Sandison, Assistant to Comptroller of Accounts, Office of Works.
Constance Eveline Shirley, Superintendent of Typists, Mines Department.
Joseph Smith, Head Master, Millfields Road Mixed School, Hackney.
Edith Lewis Sully, Woman Pension Officer, Board of Customs and Excise.
Henry Lester Butler Tarrant, Chief Clerk, Meteorological Office, Air Ministry.
James Thomson, Chief Constable, Forfar Burgh Police.
Councillor James Albert Webb  Chairman of the Salford Board of Guardians.

Diplomatic Service And Overseas List
Paul Bonett, late Treasurer of the Maltese Benevolent Fund, Alexandria.
Daniel Francis Horseman Brickell, His Majesty's Vice-Consul at Cairo.
Maud Elise Carter, Inspectress, Egyptian Ministry of Education.
Alfred Cavanagh, Chief Clerk, Sudan Government Railways and Steamers.
Theodore Harold Fox, British Vice-Consul at Philadelphia.
Henry Godfrey Wedderburn-Maxwell, Assistant District Commissioner, Upper Nile Province, Sudan.
John Webb Witty, British Vice-Consul at Barcelona.

British India
Frank Ernest Brann Pool, Provincial Civil Service, Punjab.
Major Alfred Baldwin Desouza, Indian Medical Department, Resident Medical Officer, Gokuldas Tejpal Hospital, Bombay.
William McKenzie Mather, Private Secretary to the High Commissioner for India.
John Carter, Officer Supervisor, Office of the Assistant Military Secretary to the Commander-in-Chief.
Dudley Hope Joseph Nicholas, Indian Medical Department, in charge of Government House Dispensary, Madras.
Khan Bahadur Abdur Rahim, Vice-President, Cantonment Board, Secunderabad, Hyderabad, Deccan.
John Munro, Works Assistant, Delhi. 
Henry Francis Wilson, Works Assistant, Delhi.
Rai Bahadur Thakur Jaswant Singh, Rajapur, Banda District, United Provinces.

Colonies, Protectorates, etc.
Ethel Armistead, Principal of the Wesleyan Girls Boarding School, Kandy Island of Ceylon.
Frank Cecil Clarkson, Commissioner of the Virgin Islands.
Eva Cotching  For infant welfare work at Haifa, Palestine.
Janet Dempster Cranston. For infant welfare and Girl Guide work in the Gold Coast.
Ethel Harrison, Lady Superintendent in charge of the Northrup McMillan Nurses Institute, Kenya Colony.
Joseph Edward James, Local Inspector of Schools, Presidency of Saint Christopher and Nevis.
Edgar Jullienne, Clerk of the Executive Council and Council of Government, Mauritius.
John Young McFadyen  Magistrate and Medical Officer, Anguilla Island, Presidency of Saint Christopher and Nevis.
Francis Garcier Morgan, Cashier, Treasury, Seychelles.
Elias Peter Prince, formerly Chief Clerk, Forest Department, Cyprus.
Commander Cecil Graham Tonge  (Retired), Marine Superintendent, Nyasaland Protectorate.
Ernest William Gaine Twentyman, Harbour Master, Suva, Fiji.
Rene Viader, Second Assistant Colonial Secretary, Mauritius.
Edgar Herbert Warren, Comptroller of Customs, Nyasaland Protectorate.

Members of the Order of the Companions of Honour (CH) 

Agnes Maude Royden, Eminent in the religious life of the nation.
The Right Honourable Valangiman Sankarayarayana Srinivasa Sastri. For eminent services in Indian affairs and as first incumbent of the post of Agent of the Government of India in South Africa.
Gertrude Mary Tuckwell  Member of the Advisory Committee to the Lord Chancellor for Women Justices of the Peace; Member of the Women's Central Committee on Women's Training and Employment; Member of the Executive of the Magistrates Association.

Kaisar-i-Hind Medal
First Class
Norman George Armstrong Edgley, Indian Civil Service, Assam.
Diwan Bahadur Jamiat Rai , Provincial Civil Service, Baluchistan (retired).
The Reverend Samuel Day Bawden, American Baptist Mission, Manager of the Reformatory Settlement, Kavali Nellore District, Madras.
The Reverend Robert Halliday, American Baptist Talaing Mission, Moulmein, Burma.
Julia Florence Hibberd, Honorary Lady Superintendent, Sandes Soldiers Home, Rawalpindi and Upper Topa.
The Reverend William Henry Jackson, the Blind School, Kemmendine, Burma.
Sister Josephine, All Saints Sisterhood, Sister-in-Charge, Jamsetji Jeejeebhoy Hospital, Bombay.
Mary Longmire  Lady Doctor in charge of the Church of England Zenana Missionary Society Hospital, Khammamett, Hyderabad, Deccan.
The Reverend William Sinclair Sutherland, Superintendent, Lady Willingdon Leper Settlement, Chingleput, Madras.

British Empire Medal (BEM)

Military Division
For Gallantry
Midshipman Anthony John Cobham 
Able Seaman George Paterson Niven  Citation: "On the 26th July, 1929, H.M.S. Devonshire, was carrying out full calibre firing, when at the first salvo there was a heavy explosion which blew off the roof of one of the turrets. When the explosion occurred, Midshipman A. J. Cobham immediately took stretcher parties aft and ordered one crew to follow him and the other crews to rig hoses. On reaching the turret he assisted men who were coming out of it with their clothes on fire, and took charge of the work of extinguishing the flames, getting them into stretchers etc. He followed the gunnery officer into the turret when the latter first went in and remained in the gun house until all necessary work was completed. He displayed marked initiative, coolness and pluck for an officer of his age. Able Seaman G. P. Niven, entered the turret shortly after Midshipman Cobham and helped to evacuate wounded. He followed the gunnery officer down to the pump room, saying "I'm not going to let him go down alone." After this officer had returned to the gun house, Able Seaman Niven heard someone call from below and went right down to the shell handing room to see what was wanted."

For Meritorious Service
Corporal Arthur Henry Newman, Royal Army Medical Corps.
Sergeant (Pilot) Maurice Edward Hearn, Royal Air Force.

Civil Division
For Meritorious Service
Annie Elizabeth Davies, Lady Superintendent, Manchester Prison.
Albert Edward Fox, Constable, Lancashire County Constabulary.
Alfred Charles Hayler, Chief Superintendent of Warehousemen, Board of Inland Revenue.
Frederick Hale Murfitt, Principal Artificer, National Physical Laboratory.
Charles Edward Renno, Assistant Foreman Printer, Ordnance Committee, Royal Arsenal, Woolwich.
Henry Edwin Scrivener, Assistant Commander, Metropolitan Special Constabulary.
William George Wilkinson, Class II, Chief Officer at Borstal Institution.
Aliki, Member of the Harbour Master's boat's crew, Suva, Fiji.
Aminisitai, Member of the Harbour Master's boat's crew, Suva, Fiji.

Air Force Cross
Flight Lieutenant Edward Goodwin Hilton  (Awarded a Bar to the Air Force Cross)
Flight Lieutenant John McFarlane

Air Force Medal
Flight Sergeant Joseph Edgar Brown.

King's Police Medal (KPM)

England and Wales
Henry Daniel Morgan  Chief Constable, Metropolitan Police.
Arthur Frederick Nicholson  Chief Constable, Exeter City Police.
Charles Edmund Harriss, Chief Constable, Lancaster City Police.
Lionel Decimus Longcroft Everett  Chief Constable, Liverpool City Police.
Charles Robert Clark, Superintendent, Metropolitan Police. 
Robert Heath, Chief Superintendent, Staffordshire Constabulary.
Ernest Boshier, Superintendent, Surrey Constabulary.
John Henderson  Superintendent and Deputy Chief Constable, North Riding Constabulary.
Thomas Horton  Superintendent, West Riding Constabulary.
Richard Thomas, Superintendent, Manchester City Police.
Edward Michael Ockey, Detective Inspector, Metropolitan Police.
Herbert North, Inspector, Hull City Police Fire Brigade.
Charles Bacon, Sergeant, Metropolitan Police.
Henry Beacham, Constable, Metropolitan Police.
James Cole, Constable, Metropolitan Police.
Harry Hall, Constable, Metropolitan Police.
Albert Highgate, Constable, Metropolitan Police.
Reginald Granville Jones, Constable, Metropolitan Police.
Ronald King Lovejoy, Constable, Metropolitan Police.
Thomas Braithwaite, Constable, Lancashire Constabulary.
William James Wooff, Constable, Lancashire Constabulary.
John Muse Branthwaite, formerly Constable, Metropolitan Police.
Charles Wright Tozer, Second Officer, Birmingham Fire Brigade.

Scotland
Alexander Wesley Christie, Chief Constable, Airdrie Burgh Police.
Alexander Marr  Chief Constable, Montrose Burgh Police.
Ronald Irvine, Constable, Lanarkshire Constabulary.
Peter McGregor, Constable, Glasgow City Police.
Robert Rathney, Constable, Glasgow City Police.

Northern Ireland
James Heather, Second Officer, Newry Fire Brigade.

Australia
Ernest Budgen, Foot Constable, South Australian Police Force.
John Clement King, Foot Constable, South Australian Police Force.
William Richard Taylor, Sergeant, Police Force, Tasmania.

Union of South Africa
Cornelius Stephanus Rademeyer, Constable, South African Police Force.

British India
Frederick William O'Gorman, Superintendent, Bombay Police. (Bar to the King's Police Medal)
Ramnad Perumal Nayudu Krishnaswami Nayudu, Head Constable, Madras Police.
Trichinopoly S. Kannuswami Nayudu Krishnaswami Nayudu, Probationary Head Constable, Madras Police.
Saiyid Hussain, Sub-Inspector, Madras Police.
Sadashiv Rajba Rane, Constable, Bombay City Police.
Claude Harold Klein, Inspector, Bombay City Police.
Muhammad Din Khan, Constable, Eastern Bengal and Assam Bengal Railway Police.
Abdus Subhan, Officiating Assistant Sub-Inspector, Bengal Police.
Raja Ram Ahir, Constable, Bengal Police.
Upendra Nath Datta, Officiating Inspector, Bengal Police.
Muhamad Ishaq Naik, United Provinces Police.
Denis Arthur MacKaura McCarthy, Assistant Superintendent, United Provinces Police.
Kazim Raza, Assistant Superintendent, United Provinces Police.
Safdar Ali, Officiating Inspector, Punjab Police.
Asa Singh, Constable, Punjab Police.
Munir Khan, Constable, Punjab Police.
Francis McElligott, District Superintendent, Burma Police.
Khan Bahadur Jalal Din, Naib-Commandant, Burma Military Police.
Henry Forsyth Reynolds, District Superintendent, Burma Police.
Captain Cyril Leslie Dunn  Assistant Commandant, Burma Military Police.
Ratan Bir Lama, Havildar, Burma Military Police.
Makerdhoj Limbu, Naik, Burma Military Police.
Thomas Allen Daff, Superintendent Bihar and Orissa Police.
Gordon Shelley Lightfoot, Assistant Superintendent of Police, Assam.
Ernest Ridley Taylor, Superintendent, North-West Frontier Province Police.
Ghulam Rasal, Constable, North-West Frontier Province Police.
M. Yarak Khan, Sub-Inspector, Baluchistan Police.
Rai Bahadur Lala Bhagwan Das  Indian Police Service.
Michael Francis Cleary, Indian Police Service.
William Cecil Edwards, Superintendent of Police, Western India States Agency.
Sardar Gurdial Singh Dhillon, Superintendent of Police, Patiala State.

His Majesty Has also graciously consented to the King's Police Medal being handed to the next-of-kin of the undermentioned officer, who was killed on the 28th March, 1929, and would have received the decoration had he survived:
Jiwan Singh, Naik, United Provinces Police.

Colonies, Protectorates and Mandated Territories 
Mehta Prithri Chand, Chief Inspector of Police, Straits Settlements.
Cherag Din, Subedar Major, Federated Malay States Police.
Nicolas Haji Georghiou, Lance Corporal, Cyprus Military Police.
Salesi Sivaro, Constable, Fiji Constabulary.
Roy Godfrey Bullen Spacer  Commissioner of Police, Kenya.
Tang Chew, Detective, Federated Malay States Police.

Royal Red Cross (RRC) 
First Class
Superintending Sister Nita Courtice 
Superintending Sister Marguerite M. Abraham 

Second Class
Nursing Sister Leonora G. Hooper.
Nursing Sister Alice M. Shrewsbury.

References

New Year Honours
1930 in Australia
1930 in Canada
1930 in India
1930 in New Zealand
1930 in the United Kingdom
1930 awards